Wild Rose Idlewild Airport,  is a public use airport located  northeast of the central business district of Wild Rose, a village in Waushara County, Wisconsin, United States.

Although most airports in the United States use the same three-letter location identifier for the FAA and International Air Transport Association (IATA), this airport is assigned W23 by the FAA but has no designation from the IATA.

Facilities and aircraft 
It has two runways: 9/27 is 2,990 by 100 feet (911 x 30 m) with a turf surface and 18/36 is 1,695 by 100 feet (517 x 30 m) also with a turf surface.

For the 12-month period ending August 31, 2021, the airport had 1,500 aircraft operations, an average of 4 per day; all general aviation. In January 2023, there were 17 aircraft based at this airport: 11 single-engine and 6 ultralight.

See also
 List of airports in Wisconsin

References

External links 

Airports in Wisconsin
Buildings and structures in Waushara County, Wisconsin